Copgrove railway station served the village of Copgrove, North Yorkshire, England  from 1875 to 1964 on the Pilmoor, Boroughbridge and Knaresborough Railway.

History 
The station opened on 1 April 1875 by the North Eastern Railway. It closed to passengers on 25 September 1950 and to goods traffic on 5 October 1964.

References

External links 

Former North Eastern Railway (UK) stations
Railway stations in Great Britain opened in 1875
Railway stations in Great Britain closed in 1950
1875 establishments in England
1964 disestablishments in England